Zodarion albipatellare is a spider species found in Crete.

See also
 List of Zodariidae species

albipatellare
Spiders of Europe
Spiders described in 2009